Romualdo Coviello (8 May 1940 – 21 January 2022) was an Italian politician. A member of the Christian Democracy party, the Italian People's Party, and lastly Democracy is Freedom – The Daisy, he served in the Senate of the Republic from 1987 to 2006. He died in Rome on 21 January 2022, at the age of 81.

References

1940 births
2022 deaths
Christian Democracy (Italy) politicians
Italian People's Party (1994) politicians
Democracy is Freedom – The Daisy politicians
Members of the Senate of the Republic (Italy)
Senators of Legislature X of Italy
Senators of Legislature XII of Italy
Senators of Legislature XIII of Italy
Senators of Legislature XI of Italy
Senators of Legislature XIV of Italy
People from Avigliano